Class 32 may refer to:
 BHP Newcastle 32 class, Australian diesel-electric locomotive
 L&YR Class 32, British 0-8-2T steam locomotive
 South African Class 32-000, South African diesel-electric locomotive introduced in 1959
 South African Class 32-200, South African diesel-electric locomotive introduced in 1966